Michel Côté  (born June 25, 1950) is a Canadian actor. He is best known for his performances in the films Cruising Bar, Life After Love (La vie après l'amour) and C.R.A.Z.Y., the theatrical show Broue and the television series Omertà.

Career
Côté taught introductory acting and improvisation at the Option Theatre in Ste. Therese until 1977. He subsequently cofounded a small theatre, Vogagements.  In 1979 Côté began performing in the play Broue at the theatre; the play was intended to have a one-month run, but ended up being staged in many cities across Canada, and Cote continued to perform in all of the more than 2,000 presentations as late as 2008.

Côté played the lead role in the film Cruising Bar, and was nominated for a Genie Award for Best Performance by an Actor in a Leading Role in 1990. He also played the lead role in the film C.R.A.Z.Y., and won a Genie in the same category for this film in 2005. In 2008, he revived his Cruising Bar characters in the sequel film Cruising Bar 2, for which he received a Jutra Award nomination for Best Actor at the 11th Jutra Awards,

In 2009, Côté played a lead role in the film De père en flic, which took in $10.5 million at the box office in Quebec. In 2010, he appeared as pilot Robert Piché in the film Piché: The Landing of a Man (Piché, entre ciel et terre), and in 2011 he starred as Roger Gendron in A Sense of Humour (Le sens de l'humour).

He founded Broue with Marc Messier and Marcel Gauthier in 1979.

He was appointed to the Order of Canada in 2022, with the rank of Officer.

He is married to French actress Véronique Le Flaguais. Their son Maxime Le Flaguais is also an actor.

References

External links 
 

1950 births
Living people
20th-century Canadian dramatists and playwrights
21st-century Canadian dramatists and playwrights
Canadian male film actors
Canadian male stage actors
Canadian male television actors
French Quebecers
People from Alma, Quebec
Male actors from Quebec
Writers from Quebec
Canadian dramatists and playwrights in French
Best Actor Genie and Canadian Screen Award winners
Canadian male dramatists and playwrights
20th-century Canadian male writers
21st-century Canadian male writers
Best Supporting Actor Jutra and Iris Award winners
Officers of the Order of Canada